Haleomyces is a genus of fungi in the family Verrucariaceae. A monotypic genus, it contains the single species Haleomyces oropogonicola.

References

Verrucariales
Lichen genera
Monotypic Eurotiomycetes genera
Taxa named by David Leslie Hawksworth
Taxa described in 1993